Keith Richard Bebbington (born 4 August 1943) is an English former footballer who played in the Football League for Oldham Athletic, Rochdale and Stoke City.

Career
Bebbington was a quick left winger who came through the youth team at Stoke City. He made his debut against Luton Town in September 1962. He had a good debut season with Stoke as in 1962–63 they won the Second Division title. In 1963–64 Stoke made it to the 1964 Football League Cup Final against Leicester City, Bebbington scoring the first goal of a two legged tie becoming Stoke's first cup final goalscorer, Stoke however lost 4–3 on aggregate.

In the 1965–66 season the substitute was introduced and Bebbington was Stoke's first sub replacing Dennis Viollet on the opening day away at Arsenal. He spent two more seasons at the Victoria Ground and after making 124 appearances, scoring 22 goals he left for Oldham Athletic. He became a key figure with the "Latics" as he made 237 appearances in the league in six years with the club. He finished his career with Rochdale.

Career statistics

Honours
Stoke City
 Football League Second Division champions: 1962–63
 Football League Cup runners-up: 1964

Oldham Athletic
 Football League Fourth Division 3rd place (promotion): 1970–71

References

External links
 

1943 births
People from Malpas, Cheshire
Living people
Sportspeople from Cheshire
English footballers
Stoke City F.C. players
Rochdale A.F.C. players
Oldham Athletic A.F.C. players
Winsford United F.C. players
English Football League players
Association football forwards